Gaastra is a city in Iron County in the U.S. state of Michigan.  As of the 2010 census, the city population was 347, making it Michigan's third-smallest incorporated city by population after Omer (259) and Lake Angelus (290).

History
The land was first purchased in 1879 by Alfred Kidder of Marquette. The land was transferred to a number of other owners, Andrew Young (1884), Ediwn H. Piper (1902). The city is named after Douwe Gaastra, a building contractor and real estate speculator who bought the land in October 1908 and platted the town. A post office was established with the first postmaster being Olaf A. Olson on September 26, 1914. It was incorporated as a village in 1919 and as a city in 1949. Olson retired as postmaster in 1953.

Geography

Demographics

2010 census
As of the census of 2010, there were 347 people, 151 households, and 102 families residing in the city. The racial makeup of the city was 98.3% White, 0.6% Native American, and 1.2% from two or more races. Hispanic or Latino of any race were 1.2% of the population.

There were 151 households, of which 26.5% had children under the age of 18 living with them, 51.0% were married couples living together, 11.9% had a female householder with no husband present, 4.6% had a male householder with no wife present, and 32.5% were non-families. 30.5% of all households were made up of individuals, and 22.5% had someone living alone who was 65 years of age or older. The average household size was 2.30 and the average family size was 2.82.

The median age in the city was 46.7 years. 23.3% of residents were under the age of 18; 7% were between the ages of 18 and 24; 17.9% were from 25 to 44; 25.9% were from 45 to 64; and 25.9% were 65 years of age or older. The gender makeup of the city was 44.4% male and 55.6% female.

2000 census
As of the census of 2000, there were 339 people, 146 households, and 102 families residing in the city. The racial makeup of the city was 97.35% White, 0.59% Native American, 0.59% from other races, and 1.47% from two or more races. Hispanic or Latino of any race were 0.88% of the population. 22.0% were of Italian, 20.1% Polish, 13.9% Finnish, 10.6% French and 8.1% American ancestry according to Census 2000. 97.3% spoke English and 2.7% Polish as their first language.

There were 146 households, out of which 28.1% had children under the age of 18 living with them, 57.5% were married couples living together, 8.9% had a female householder with no husband present, and 30.1% were non-families. 30.1% of all households were made up of individuals, and 19.9% had someone living alone who was 65 years of age or older.  The average household size was 2.32 and the average family size was 2.87.

In the city, the population was spread out, with 24.5% under the age of 18, 6.8% from 18 to 24, 20.9% from 25 to 44, 20.9% from 45 to 64, and 26.8% who were 65 years of age or older.  The median age was 44 years. For every 100 females, there were 87.3 males.  For every 100 females age 18 and over, there were 86.9 males.

The median income for a household in the city was $23,125, and the median income for a family was $35,521. Males had a median income of $24,750 versus $29,583 for females. The per capita income for the city was $15,797.  About 21.2% of families and 22.2% of the population were below the poverty line, including 39.5% of those under age 18 and 10.9% of those age 65 or over.

Government
Gaastra has no police department and the Caspian / Gaastra Volunteer Fire Department is their joint fire department.

References

Sources

Cities in Iron County, Michigan